Briggs House may refer to:

Alexander Briggs House, Charleston, Illinois
Henshie-Briggs Row House, Des Moines, Iowa
Long-Briggs House, Russellville, Kentucky, listed on the National Register of Historic Places
Samuel and Mary Logan Briggs House, Stanford, Kentucky
William Briggs Homestead, Auburn, Maine
George I. Briggs House, Bourne, Massachusetts
William S. Briggs Homestead, a contributing building to the Alcove Historic District, Alcove, New York
Bruce-Briggs Brick Block, Lancaster, New York
John Briggs House, Milo Center, New York
Joseph Briggs House, Coventry, Rhode Island